Roman-Kosh is the highest peak of the Crimean Mountains.

See also
 List of European ultra prominent peaks

References

Sources
 Енциклопедія українознавства. У 10-х томах. / Головний редактор Володимир Кубійович. — Париж; Нью-Йорк: Молоде життя, 1954–1989.

Crimean Mountains
One-thousanders of Ukraine